Vioja Mahakamani is a Kenyan comedy series and one of the country's most popular television shows. The show has been broadcast for 25 years. The series can be viewed on Kenya Broadcasting Corporation.

References

Kenyan comedy television series
Kenya Broadcasting Corporation original programming